Born is a German surname. Notable people with the surname include:

Adolf Born (1930–2016), Czech painter and illustrator
B. H. Born (1932–2013), American basketball player
Brooksley Born (born 1940), American lawyer and public official
Claire Born (1898–1965), German operatic soprano
Elina Born (born 1994), Estonian singer
Georgina Born (born 1955), British anthropologist and musician
Ignaz von Born (1742–1791), Austrian mineralogist and metallurgist
Max Born (1882–1970), German mathematician and physicist
Maurice Born (1943–2020), Swiss architect and ethnographer
Sam Born (1891–1959), American businessman, candy maker and inventor

See also
Borne (disambiguation)

German-language surnames